Fesdis is a town in north-eastern Algeria.

Nassim

Communes of Batna Province
Batna Province